The Buckmobile was an American automobile manufactured between 1902 and 1905 in Utica, New York, by the Buckmobile Company. A prototype was created in 1901 before the company was incorporated. The automobile was a 15-horsepower, and 20 horsepower twin-cylinder roadster, and used the advertising slogan "Ease of Riding Without a Peer".  Engines and transmissions were sourced and the bodies and suspension were built in-house.
The company added extensions to their factory to increase production, but this dealt a crippling financial blow to the company.
In October 1904 the firm was merged with the Black Diamond Automobile Company, but by July 1905 production had finished. The business was sold in a sheriff's sale shortly after, with total Buckmobile production estimated at 40 cars.

Advertisements

References

Veteran vehicles
Defunct motor vehicle manufacturers of the United States
Vehicle manufacturing companies established in 1903
Vehicle manufacturing companies disestablished in 1905
Defunct manufacturing companies based in New York (state)